Exo Next Door (lit. "Exo Lives Next Door to My House") is a 2015 South Korean web series starring Moon Ga-young and members of the K-pop boy band Exo (with the latter playing fictionalized versions of themselves). It aired on Naver TV Cast from April 9 to May 28, 2015, on Tuesdays and Thursdays at 22:00 for 16 episodes.

Exo Next Door became one of the most popular web series in Korea with 50 million views; this led to CJ E&M re-editing it into a film version, which was then sold to overseas buyers at the 68th Cannes Film Market.

Plot
Ji Yeon-hee (Moon Ga-young) is an extremely shy, introverted 23-year-old woman with zero dating experience and a tendency to blush when talking to someone she likes. One day, four young men move into the house right next door to Yeon-hee's home, and to her surprise, they turn out to be Chanyeol (Park Chanyeol), D.O. (Do Kyungsoo), Baekhyun (Byun Baekhyun) and Sehun (Oh Sehun) from her favorite boy band Exo, who are looking to lay low for a while. They hire her to clean their house part-time during the winter vacation and that's when Yeon-hee found out that Chanyeol was her long lost childhood friend and crush "Chan" and that he is the grandson of the house owner. As the story goes on, Yeon-hee soon becomes involved in a love triangle with Chanyeol and D.O.

Cast

Main cast
Park Chanyeol as Chanyeol
Jung Jae-hyuk as young Chanyeol
Moon Ga-young as Ji Yeon-hee
Han Seo-jin as young Ji Yeon-hee
Do Kyung-soo as D.O.
Byun Baek-hyun as Baekhyun
Oh Se-hun as Sehun

Supporting cast
Jang Yoo-sang as Ji Kwang-soo
Kim Jong-in as Kai
Kim Jun-myeon as Suho
Kim Min-seok as Xiumin
Zhang Yixing as Lay
Kim Jong-dae as Chen
Huang Zitao as Tao
Kim Hee-jung as Yeon-hee's mother
Jeon Soo-jin as Ga-eun
Yoon Joo-sang as Chanyeol's grandfather
Jung Si-hyun as Min-hwan

Original soundtracks

The Song "Beautiful" became the first OST single from a web drama to top digital charts.

Awards and nominations

References

External links
Exo Next Door at Naver TV Cast 

2015 web series debuts
2015 web series endings
South Korean web series
Television series by SM C&C
Television series by Oh! Boy Project
Exo
Naver TV original programming
South Korean musical television series